In the U.S. state of Wyoming,  the state legislature passed a bill limiting the office of Governor to two consecutive terms after Democratic Governor Edgar Herschler served three terms into the mid-1980s. Then in 1992, voters approved term limits by ballot initiative.

Neither action constituted an amendment to the Wyoming Constitution. Twelve years later, two state legislators challenged the term limit law in a lawsuit; the Wyoming Supreme Court invalidated the limits in a unanimous decision, ruling that a constitutional amendment would be required to establish such a law.

The ruling did not apply directly to statewide executive positions (including the office of Governor), but it was expected in early 2009 that popular Governor Dave Freudenthal might challenge that law on the same grounds.

See also
Term limits in the United States

References 

Politics of Wyoming
Wyoming